Polypède is an outdoor 1967 bronze sculpture by Charles Daudelin, installed at Montreal's McGill University, in Quebec, Canada.

References

External links

 

1967 establishments in Canada
1967 sculptures
Bronze sculptures in Canada
McGill University
Outdoor sculptures in Montreal